The 2006 Vuelta a Murcia was the 22nd edition of the Vuelta a Murcia cycle race and was held on 1 March to 5 March 2006. The race started and finished in Murcia. The race was won by Santos González.

General classification

References

2006
2006 in road cycling
2006 in Spanish sport